The United States federal government requires unpaid leave for serious illnesses, but does not require that employees have access to paid sick leave to address their own short-term illnesses or the short-term illness of a family member. However, a number of states and localities do require some or all employers to provide paid sick leave to their workers.

Availability 

A 2009 analysis from the Bureau of Labor Statistics (BLS) found that around 39 percent of American workers in the private sector do not have paid sick leave. Around 79 percent of workers in low-wage industries do not have paid sick time. Most food service and hotel workers (78 percent) lack paid sick days.

A 2008 survey reported that 77 percent of Americans believe that having paid sick days is "very important" for workers. Some workers report that they or a family member have been fired or suspended for missing work due to illness.

A 2020 paper found that requiring paid sick leave in the US likely increased overall well-being.  When paid sick leave is required by law, workers tended to take two more days off work each year.

Unpaid sick leave 
The US requires unpaid leave for serious illnesses through the Family and Medical Leave Act (FMLA). This law requires most medium-sized and larger employers to comply and, within those businesses, covers employees who have worked for their employer for at least 12 months prior to taking the leave.

Paid sick leave 
16 states and Washington DC require paid sick leave, while 34 states do not. 18 states preempt local governments from requiring paid sick leave. Some localities require paid sick leave.

Alabama 
Alabama does not require paid sick leave and preempts local governments from requiring it.

Alaska 
Alaska does not require paid sick leave.

Arizona 
All full-time, part-time, and temporary workers earn one hour of paid sick leave for every 30 hours worked. Employees of companies with 15 or more employees can accrue up to 40 hours a year, while employees of smaller companies can only accrue 24 hours a year. Companies are only required to allow employees to use their time off after being employed for 90 days.

Arkansas 
Arkansas does not require paid sick leave and preempts local governments from requiring it.

California 
All employees are entitled to earn one hour of paid sick leave every 30 hours after working 30 days. Employees can earn up to 48 hours a year, but companies can limit the amount one can use to 24. Unused hours are carried over. Companies are only required to allow employees to use their time off after being employed for 90 days. San Francisco, Oakland, Long Beach, San Diego, Emeryville, Santa Monica, Los Angeles, and Berkley have more expansive requirements.

Colorado 
All employees earn one hour of paid sick leave for every 30 hours worked and can accrue and use up to 48 a year, with unused hours being carried over. If a public health emergency is declared, full-time workers are allowed an additional 80 hours off, while part-time workers are allowed an additional number of days equal to their average days worked a week or schedules to work in 14 days.

Connecticut 
Companies with 50 or more employees are required to provide paid sick leave to hourly, service workers. Temporary or day workers are not included. Employees earn one hour off for every 40 hours worked and can use up to 40 hours a year, with unused hours carrying over.

Delaware 
Delaware does not require paid sick leave.

Florida 
Florida does not require paid sick leave and preempts local government from requiring it.

Georgia 
Georgia does not require paid sick leave and preempts local government from requiring it.

Hawaii 
Hawaii does not require paid sick leave.

Idaho 
Idaho does not require paid sick leave.

Illinois 
Illinois does not require paid sick leave, but Cook County and its county seat of Chicago do, although some municipalities have opted out. In those two localities, anyone, except government employees and some construction workers, who works more than 80 hours within 120 days can earn one hour off for every 40 hours worked. The maximum time off is 40 hours a year.

Indiana 
Indiana does not require paid sick leave and preempts local government from requiring it.

Iowa 
Iowa does not require paid sick leave and preempts local government from requiring it.

Kansas 
Kansas does not require paid sick leave and preempts local government from requiring it.

Kentucky 
Kentucky does not require paid sick leave and preempts local government from requiring it.

Louisiana 
Louisiana does not require paid sick leave and preempts local government from requiring it.

Maine 
Companies with 10 or more employees are required to give employees one hour of paid leave for every 40 hours worked. Leave can be used for any purpose, but planned leave required 4 weeks notice. Only 40 hours can be used a year, with unused hours carrying over. Employers are only required to allow workers to take time off after being employed for 120 days.

Maryland 
Companies with 25 or more employees are required to give anyone who works over 12 hours a week paid sick leave. Workers earn 1 hour of paid sick leave every 30 hours and can use up to 40 hours a year. Unused time can be carried over, but employers can limit the number of accrued hours to 64. Local governments are preempted from putting into place more expansive requirements, but this seems to be unenforced, as Montgomery County grants up to 56 hours of paid sick leave to anyone who works more than 8 hours a week and for a company with more than 5 employees.

Massachusetts 
Most employees who work for companies with more than 11 employees are entitled to 40 hours of paid sick leave after being employed for 90 days.

Michigan 
In 2015, Michigan preempted local governments from requiring paid sick leave, but in 2018, they passed a law requiring paid sick leave for companies with 50 or more employees. Workers earn one hour of sick leave for every 35 hours worked. Up to 40 hours can be earned, but it can only be used after being employed 90 days.

Minnesota 
Minnesota does not require paid sick leave. In Duluth, companies with at least 5 employees are required to give workers up to 40 hours of sick leave per year. In Minneapolis, employees who work more than 80 hours are guaranteed 48 hours of sick leave, if they work for a company with 6 or more employees. In St. Paul, employees who work more than 80 hours are entitled to up 48 hours a year.

Mississippi 
Mississippi does not require paid sick leave and preempts local government from requiring it.

Missouri 
Missouri does not require paid sick leave and preempts local government from requiring it.

Montana 
Montana does not require paid sick leave.

Nebraska 
Nebraska does not require paid sick leave.

Nevada 
Companies with 50 or more employees are required to give full-time employees sick leave. Temporary or seasonal employees are not included. Workers earn 0.01923 hours of paid leave for every hour worked, which can be used after 90 days of employment. Unused hours carry over.

New Hampshire 
New Hampshire does not require paid sick leave.

New Jersey 
All companies are required to give up to 40 hours of paid sick leave per year for both full- and part-time employees, except per diem healthcare employees and unionized construction workers. Eligible employees earn one hour of paid sick leave for evert 30 hours worked and can use it after 120 days after being hired. Unused time can be carried over. Local governments are preempted from creating their own requirements.

New Mexico 
Workers earn one hour of paid sick leave for every 30 hours worked and can use up to 64 hours per year, with unused hours being carried over.

New York 
Companies with 5 or more employees or a net income of more than $1M must provide paid sick leave. Both part- and full-time employees earn one hour off for every 30 hours worked and can use up to 40 hour a year. Employees of companies with more than 100 employees are entitled to 56 hours per year. Government employees are not covered. Unused hours can be carried over. Cities with a population of over one million can create more expansive requirements and both Westchester County and New York City have done so.

North Carolina 
North Carolina does not require paid sick leave and preempts local government from requiring it.

North Dakota 
North Dakota does not require paid sick leave.

Ohio 
Ohio does not require paid sick leave and preempts local government from requiring it.

Oklahoma 
Oklahoma does not require paid sick leave and preempts local government from requiring it.

Oregon 
Companies with 10 or more employees must provide up to 40 hours of paid sick leave per year, which can be used 90 days after being hired. Full-time, part-time, and temporary employees are covered and earn one hour off for every 40 hours worked. Although state law preempts local governments from creating their own requirements, companies with 6 or more employees must provide time off in Portland.

Pennsylvania 
Pennsylvania does not require paid sick leave. In Philadelphia, companies with 10 or more employees must provide up to 40 hours of paid sick leave. Pittsburgh requires companies with 15 or more employees to provide up to 40 hours, while small business employees are only entitled to 24 hours per year.

Rhode Island 
Companies with more than 18 employees must provide up to 40 hours of paid sick leave to full-time, part-time, and temporary employees. Workers earn one hour off for every 34 hours worked, which can be used after 90 days for full-time employees, 180 days for part-time employees, and 150 days for seasonal employees.

South Carolina 
South Carolina does not require paid sick leave and preempts local government from requiring it.

South Dakota 
North Dakota does not require paid sick leave.

Tennessee 
Tennessee does not require paid sick leave and preempts local government from requiring it.

Texas 
Texas does not require paid sick leave and preempts local government from requiring it.

Utah 
Utah does not require paid sick leave.

Vermont 
Employees who work over 18 hours per week, on average annually, are entitled to up to 40 hours of paid sick leave. Both full- and part-time employees are covered, but it does not apply to seasonal employees, per diem healthcare workers, federal workers, and some state workers. New businesses are exempt for 12 months after hiring their first employee. Employees earn one hour off for every 52 hours worked, which can be used one year after being hired.

Virginia 
Virginia does not require paid sick leave.

Washington 
Employees earn one hour of paid sick leave for every 40 hours worked. There's no maximum number of hours than can be accrued, but only 40 hours can be carried over into the next year. SeaTac, Seattle, and Tacoma have more expansive requirements.

Washington DC 
Companies with 24 or fewer employees are required to give up to 3 days of sick leave per year, companies with 25 to 99 employees are required to give 5, and companies with 100 or more employees must provide 7. Time can be used after 90 days of employment and unused time can be carried over.

West Virginia 
West Virginia does not require paid sick leave.

Wisconsin 
Wisconsin does not require paid sick leave and preempts local government from requiring it.

Wyoming 
Wyoming does not require paid sick leave.

Proposed policies in the United States

Public opinion 
In August 2008, the National Opinion Research Center at the University of Chicago released their findings from a national public opinion poll on paid sick days.

 86 percent of people surveyed said they favor a basic paid sick day policy.
 94 percent of self-identified liberals and 81 percent of self-identified conservatives believed that paid sick day should be a basic workplace right.
 77 percent of respondents believed that paid sick days were very important.
 63 percent of workers who do not have access to paid sick leave said they are concerned about not having paid sick days.
 16 percent of workers report that they or a family member have been fired, suspended, or otherwise punished or that they would be fired if they missed work due to illness.
 46 percent of respondents said they are more likely to vote for a candidate who supports paid sick days.

U.S. federal legislation 
The Healthy Families Act (HR 2460 / S 1152) would establish a basic workplace mandate of paid sick days so workers can take paid sick days to care for their health or the health of their families.

The bill creates a minimum requirement that allows workers to earn up to seven days per year of paid leave to recover from illness, to care for a sick family member, or to seek preventative health care. It enables victims of domestic violence, stalking, and sexual assault to take paid time off to recover from incidents and seek assistance from the police or court. It also allows people to take time off to care for ill parents and elderly relatives, or to attend diagnostic or routine medical appointments. Employers with fewer than 15 workers would be exempt from the law.

The Healthy Families Act would allow an additional 30 million workers to have access to paid sick leave from their jobs, including 15 million low-wage workers and 13 million women workers. If the bill were to become law, 90 percent of all American workers would have access to paid sick days (up from 61 percent currently).

A version of the bill was first introduced in 2004. Each session, it has gained support inside and outside of Congress. Congresswoman Rosa DeLauro and Senator Edward Kennedy reintroduced the Healthy Families Act in the 111th Congress in May 2009. After Senator Kennedy's death, Senator Chris Dodd became the lead Senate sponsor of the Healthy Families Act. The bill currently has 125 co-sponsors in the House and 24 in the Senate.

The Healthy Families Act was the subject of three hearings in the 111th United States Congress:

 House Education and Labor Committee's Workforce Protections Subcommittee hearing on the Healthy Families Act on June 11, 2009.
 Senate Committee on Health, Education, Labor and Pensions, Subcommittee on Children and Families hearing, "The Cost of Being Sick: H1N1 and Paid Sick Days," on November 10, 2009.
 House Education and Labor Committee hearing, "Protecting Employees, Employers and the Public: H1N1 and Sick Leave Policies," on November 17, 2009.

The Obama Administration has testified in support of the bill. First Lady Michelle Obama has spoken out on numerous occasions about the need for a paid sick day mandate.

The U.S. government guarantees federal employees 13 paid sick days a year.

References 

United States labor law